Fairland is an unincorporated community in Burnet County, Texas, United States. According to the Handbook of Texas, the community had an estimated population of 290 in 2000.

History
Several families from the eastern states settled here in the early 1850s. It is on a strip of level land between Backbone Ridge and the Slaughter Range, which they called "fair land". Some of those settlers included John Harvey, Jefferson Barton, and several families surnamed Cates, Thomas, Atwood, Graham, Slaughter, Joy, Reed, Alexander, Ferguson, and Chesser. Senia Barton Harvey was given a land grant for a Methodist church in 1859. Residents helped to build a church building made out of stone, but it was halted by the American Civil War, since many of the male residents left to fight. As a result, it was not completed until 1870. The first church service was held by Rev. Arter Crownover. The Bear Creek Circuit, which was the third quarterly Methodist conference from Lampasas, named the house and lot Crownover Chapel on July 13, 1872. A picnic was held after the completion of the church. Three years later, a Christian Church was built. Then, a Church of Christ was built in 1887. When the congregation disbanded, they met in different homes, starting in 1937. They then joined a group in nearby Marble Falls. A post office was established at Fairland in 1890 and remained in operation until 1951, but the first one was built in 1874 and was called Backbone Valley. Local mail was then sent to the community from Marble Falls. Fairland had a population of 200 in 1925. It then plummeted to 50 in 1939 and remained at that level through the mid-1960s. The old rock church building continued to be maintained by the community and became a community center in the late 1980s. Fairland was still listed on county maps in 1990 and had a population of 290 in 2000.

The Austin Western Railroad and Austin and Northwestern Railroads travel through the community.

Geography

Education
In 1859, a school was built on Senia Harvey's land grant. A school was also started in the local Methodist church. The rock church building had an extra room added for a classroom for many years. The school, along with the Tobey school, came together in 1937 and joined the Marble Falls independent school District sometime after 1943. It continues to be served by Marble Falls ISD today, with elementary kids attending Colt Elementary.

References

Unincorporated communities in Burnet County, Texas
Unincorporated communities in Texas